Cynodon is a genus of dogtooth characins from tropical South America, including the Amazon and Orinoco basins, and rivers in the Guianas. They are mainly piscivorous, but will also take insects.

Species
There are currently three described species in this genus:
 Cynodon gibbus (Agassiz, 1829)
 Cynodon meionactis Géry, Le Bail & Keith, 1999
 Cynodon septenarius Toledo-Piza, 2000

References

Cynodontidae
Taxa named by Johann Baptist von Spix
Taxa_named_by_Louis_Agassiz
Fish of South America